The Las Vegas Invitational is an 8 team college basketball tournament held during Thanksgiving of NCAA Division I men's college basketball season annually since 2003. The Tournament was originally held in the gymnasium of Valley High School, until moving to the new Orleans Arena in 2006.

The tourney launched with local car dealer Findlay Toyota as its sponsor. From 2006 to 2013 the sponsor of the tournament was IBN Sports. Continental Tire is the current sponsor of the tournament. Fox Sports purchased the event and the Las Vegas Classic in 2015.

Brackets 
* – Denotes overtime period

2022

2021
The 2021 Las Vegas Invitational Basketball Tournament at the Orleans Hotel & Casino included: UAB, New Mexico, San Francisco, and Towson.

2019

2018
Teams:

2017

2016

2015

Note:
Arkansas Little Rock will only Participate on Day 1
On November 27 East Carolina will play winner of Bethune–Cookman/Stetson, Sam Houston State will play loser of Bethune–Cookman/Stetson

2014
The Tournament went back to the traditional format, There will be two brackets

2013
The tournament's championship format was changed to a four-round round robin this year, with the final two rounds being played in Las Vegas. UCLA and Missouri were the co-champions of the tournament, both teams finishing with a 4-0 record; Kyle Anderson (UCLA) was the tournament's MVP.

All-tournament team
Gardner–Webb:  Isaiah Ivey
Morehead State:  Angelo Warner
Chattanooga:  Z. Mason
IUPUI:  Ja'rob McCallum
Missouri: Jordan Clarkson, Jabari Brown
Nevada:  Deonte Burton
UCLA:  Jordan Adams, Zach LaVine
Northwestern:  Jershon Cobb

Tournament MVP:  Kyle Anderson, UCLA

2012 participants and bracket

 Arizona State
 Arkansas
 Creighton
 Wisconsin
 Cornell
 Longwood
 Florida A&M
 Presbyterian

2011 participants and bracket 

 USC
 UNLV
 North Carolina
 South Carolina
 Cal Poly
 Mississippi Valley State
 Morgan State
 Tennessee State

2010 participants and bracket 

 Arizona
 Kansas
 Santa Clara
 Ohio
 Bethune–Cookman
 Northern Colorado
 Texas A&M–Corpus Christi
 Santa Clara
 Valparaiso

2009

Campus Round

Championship Rounds

2008 participants and bracket

 Kansas State
 Kentucky
 Iowa
 West Virginia
 Delaware State
 Longwood
 Oakland
 Southeast Missouri State

2007 participants and bracket

 BYU
 North Carolina
 Louisville
 Old Dominion
 Hartford
 Iona
 Jackson State
 South Carolina State

2006 participants and bracket

 Ball State
 Florida
 Kansas
 WKU
 Chattanooga
 Prairie View A&M
 Tennessee State
 Towson

2005 participants and bracket

 Boston College
 Drake
 Oklahoma State
 TCU
 Buffalo
 Detroit
 Jackson State
 Shawnee State

2004 participants and bracket 

 Arizona State
 Southern Illinois
 Vanderbilt
 UTEP
 Cal State Northridge
 Delaware State
 Jackson State
 Tennessee State

2003 participants and bracket 

 Bradley
 Miami (FL)
 Lubbock Christian
 Louisiana–Monroe
 Northeastern
 Rhode Island

References

College men's basketball competitions in the United States
College basketball competitions
2000 establishments in Nevada
Recurring sporting events established in 2000
Basketball in Las Vegas
Sports competitions in Las Vegas
Basketball competitions in Nevada